was an animator who worked with Toei Animation, while it was still known as Toei Doga. He was also a famous illustrator of children's books. Mori was responsible for one of the major animation styles within Toei Animation. In The Little Prince and the Eight-Headed Dragon  Mori was the first to be credited as animation director in Japan, although Akira Daikubara had the same post on  The Tale of the White Serpent but was not credited as that. As a senior animator he formed many of the great animators of the next generation (including Hayao Miyazaki, Isao Takahata, Yasuo Ōtsuka, and Yoichi Kotabe).  He later left Toei Animation to work with Nippon Animation.

Filmography
Key animator on The Tale of the White Serpent (1958)
Animation director on The Little Prince and the Eight-Headed Dragon (1963)
Key animator on Hols: Prince of the Sun (1968)
Animation director on Puss in Boots (1969)
Animation director on Rocky Chuck the Woodchuck (1973)
Character designer on Dog of Flanders (TV series) (1975)
Key animator on Future Boy Conan (1978)
Layout supervisor, Noozles (1984)

Sources

1925 births
1992 deaths
Japanese animators
Japanese children's book illustrators
Japanese film directors
Japanese animated film directors
Toei Animation